Piqua is an unincorporated community in Woodson County, Kansas, United States.  As of the 2020 census, the population of the community and nearby areas was 90.

History
Piqua had its start in the year 1882 by the building of the railroads through the territory, and is situated at the junction of the Missouri Pacific Railroad and the Missouri-Kansas-Texas Railroad. It was named after the city of Piqua, Ohio.  The first post office in Piqua was established in March 1882.

Geography 
Latitude of Piqua is 37.922N and longitude is -95.535W.  Piqua is located on U.S. Route 54 and is east of U.S. Route 75.  Piqua is located between the cities of Yates Center and Iola.

Demographics

For statistical purposes, the United States Census Bureau has defined Piqua as a census-designated place (CDP).

Education
The community is served by Woodson USD 366 public school district.

Notable people
 Buster Keaton (1895–1966), acclaimed actor and film director. He was born in Piqua while his mother was traveling.
 Fred Kipp, Major league baseball pitcher between 1957 and 1960 with the Dodgers and Yankees.

References

Further reading

External links
 Woodson County maps: Current, Historic, KDOT

Census-designated places in Kansas
Census-designated places in Woodson County, Kansas
Populated places established in 1882
1882 establishments in Kansas